In geometry, an orthotope (also called a hyperrectangle or a box) is the generalization of a rectangle to higher dimensions.
A necessary and sufficient condition is that it is congruent to the Cartesian product of intervals. If all of the edges are equal length, it is a hypercube.

A hyperrectangle is a special case of a parallelotope.

Types
A three-dimensional orthotope is also called a right rectangular prism, rectangular cuboid, or rectangular parallelepiped.

A four-dimensional orthotope is likely a hypercuboid.

The special case of an n-dimensional orthotope where all edges have equal length is the n-cube.

By analogy, the term "hyperrectangle" or "box" can refer to Cartesian products of orthogonal intervals of other kinds, such as ranges of keys in database theory or ranges of integers, rather than real numbers.

Dual polytope

The dual polytope of an n-orthotope has been variously called a rectangular n-orthoplex, rhombic n-fusil, or n-lozenge. It is constructed by 2n points located in the center of the orthotope rectangular faces.

An n-fusil's Schläfli symbol can be represented by a sum of n orthogonal line segments: { } + { } + ... + { } or n{ }.

A 1-fusil is a line segment. A 2-fusil is a rhombus. Its plane cross selections in all pairs of axes are rhombi.

See also
 Minimum bounding box
 Cuboid

Notes

References

External links 
 
 

Polytopes
Prismatoid polyhedra
Multi-dimensional geometry